The Shakespeare Institute is a centre for postgraduate study dedicated to the study of William Shakespeare and the literature of the English Renaissance. It is part of the University of Birmingham, and is located in Stratford-upon-Avon.

The Institute was set up in 1951 at Mason Croft, the former home of novelist Marie Corelli. Budgetary problems forced it to be relocated to the main campus at Birmingham during the 1970s, but under the guidance of Professor Stanley Wells, the Institute was returned to Mason Croft in the 1980s and its position was consolidated in 1996 with the opening of the purpose-built Shakespeare Institute Library.

It has been described by the current director, Michael Dobson, as "the best place on earth in which to explore the impact Shakespeare’s work has had across four centuries of world culture".

Directors of the Institute

The directors of the Institute have been:
 Allardyce Nicoll 1951 to 1961
 Terence Spencer
 Philip Brockbank
 Stanley Wells
 Peter Holland
 Russell Jackson
 Kathleen McLuskie
 Michael Dobson

Shakespeare Institute Library

The Shakespeare Institute Library contains about 60,000 volumes (including 3,000 early printed and rare books), archives and manuscripts, and audio-visual collections. The library aims to collect every significant publication for the study of Shakespeare and Renaissance drama and the supporting collections cover literary, cultural, political, religious, and social history of the period. Significant research collections include:
 Renaissance Theatre Company archive
 Renaissance Films PLC archive
 Unpublished Shakespeare Film Script collection
 New Shakespeare Company archive
 E. K. Chambers Papers
 Newscuttings collection 1902–present
 English Short Title Catalogue 1475-1640 on microfilm
 Francis Longe Play Collection on microfilm.

Shakespeare Institute Players
The Shakespeare Institute Players is the dramatic society for the postgraduate students of the University of Birmingham's Shakespeare Institute, located in Stratford-upon-Avon.  The Shakespeare Institute Players have been around under many different names since the University of Birmingham's Shakespeare Institute has existed. The first recorded production was A Yorkshire Tragedy (Unknown Author) as The Shakespeare Institute Dramatic Society. It was performed in February 1953. Since then, the group has had many different names, but the most commonly used name (and the one by which it is currently known) is The Shakespeare Institute Players.

References

Further reading

External links
Official Website

University of Birmingham
Shakespearean scholarship
Renaissance and early modern research centres
Special collections libraries in England
Academic libraries in England